Agonum versutum is a species of ground beetle in the Platyninae subfamily that is found in most of Europe.

Description
The upper body is black with a bronze sheen or dark bronze. Microstracture of elytron is barely visible at a magnification of 30 times, and consists of a thin cross-cells.

Ecology
The species prefers the banks of ponds.

References

versutum
Beetles of Europe
Beetles described in 1824